Galantiči is a small settlement south of Kubed in the City Municipality of Koper in the Littoral region of Slovenia.

History
Galantiči was a hamlet of Poletiči until 1997, when it was administratively separated and became a settlement in its own right.

References

External links
Galantiči on Geopedia

Populated places in the City Municipality of Koper